Nuestra Belleza Nuevo León 2003, was held at the Hotel Presidente Intercontinental, San Pedro, Nuevo León on July 16, 2011. At the conclusion of the final night of competition Alejandra Villanueva of San Nicolás de los Garza was crowned the winner. Villanueva was crowned by outgoing Nuestra Belleza Nuevo León titleholder and Miss Expo World 2002 Carolina Salinas. Nine contestants competed for the title.

Results

Placements

Background Music
Patricio Borghetti

Contestants

References

External links
Official Website

Nuestra Belleza México